Giacomo Rondinella (30 August 1923 – 25 February 2015) was an Italian singer and actor.

Life and career 
Born in Messina, the son of a couple of Neapolitan actors and singers, Rondinella started his career as a singer after World War II, following failed attempts to pursue a military career and a career as a boxer. He first emerged as the winner of a contest for "New Voices" organized by Radio Napoli, and in a short time he became one of the stars of Canzone Napoletana. A real-life friend of Totò and Eduardo De Filippo, Rondinella also had a prolific career as a stage and film actor, with a peak in the first half of the 1950s. His younger brother Luciano also had a career of actor and singer.

Selected filmography
 Fire Over the Sea (1947)
 Naples Sings (1953)
 Letter from Naples (1954)
 Farewell, My Beautiful Lady (1954)
 Sunset in Naples (1955)

References

External links 

 

1923 births
2015 deaths
Musicians from Messina
Italian male film actors
20th-century Italian male actors
Italian male stage actors
20th-century Italian  male singers
Actors from Messina